Guglielmo Ciro Nasi (21 February 1879 – 21 September 1971) was an Italian general who fought in Italian East Africa during World War II.

Biography
Nasi was born in Civitavecchia, Latium. In 1912 he was sent to Libya as a Captain with the 8th Artillery Regiment and the following year was decorated for valor at the action at Safsaf. He fought in the First World War and ended the conflict as a Lieutenant-Colonel. From 1924–1928, he was the military representative of the Italian  (Royal Army) in Paris.

In 1928, Nasi was sent to the Italian colonies as Chief-of-Staff for the Colonial Troops and was Vice-Governor of Cyrenaica in 1934–1935, Governor of Harar from 1936–1939, and Governor of Shewa in 1939–1940. He also served as a Vice-Governor of Italian East Africa from 1939. Nasi promoted a moral reformation of the military and civil administration and he showed notable skills in dealing with indigenous chiefs.

In April 1936, during the Second Italo-Abyssinian War, Nasi commanded the left column of three columns during  Rodolfo Graziani′s advance on the southern front. Most of Nasi's troops were Libyans.

After the beginning of World War II, Nasi led the Italian conquest of British Somaliland in August 1940. He invaded British Somaliland and with the advantage of air cover and tanks, forced the defending British and Commonwealth forces to evacuate by sea to Aden after defeating the main body of the British army at the Battle of Tug Argan from 11 to 15 August.

During the East African Campaign, Nasi led the last stand of an Italian garrison in East Africa. On 6 July, after Duke Amedeo of Aosta and  Pietro Gazzera surrendered, Nasi became the acting Governor-General of Italian East Africa. In early 1941, during the British counter-offensive, Nasi was forced to retreat to the stronghold of Gondar. While he held out long after other Italian strongholds had fallen, Nasi finally surrendered his stronghold of Gondar on 28 November 1941.

Nasi was sent to Kenya as a prisoner of war. After the death of Duke Amedeo, he was responsible for the 60,000 Italian prisoners kept there. Nasi returned to Italy in 1945. Four years later, he was appointed as Commissar for Somalia when the latter was assigned to United Nations suzerainty. Nasi died at Modena in 1971.

Aftermath
Solomon Getahun supports this view of Nasi, noting that his behaviour towards the inhabitants of Gondar and the adjoining territories helped him to sustain the fight against both British and Ethiopian forces as long as he did. Near Gondar a mount is still named Mount Nasi.

See also
 Second Italo-Abyssinian War
 East African Campaign (World War II)
 Italian conquest of British Somaliland
 Battle of Gondar

References

Bibliography

 

1879 births
1971 deaths
People from Civitavecchia
Italian generals
Italian military personnel of World War II
Italian military personnel of the Second Italo-Ethiopian War
People of former Italian colonies
Italian East Africa
Italian prisoners of war
Grand Officers of the Order of Saints Maurice and Lazarus
Grand Officers of the Military Order of Savoy
Knights of the Order of Vittorio Veneto
Recipients of the Silver Medal of Military Valor
Recipients of the Maurician medal
Recipients of the War Merit Cross (Italy)
Governors of British Somaliland